Josipa Bura (born March 3, 1985) is a Croatian female basketball player.

External links
Profile at eurobasket.com

1985 births
Living people
Basketball players from Šibenik
Croatian women's basketball players
Centers (basketball)
ŽKK Novi Zagreb players
ŽKK Vojvodina players
Mediterranean Games bronze medalists for Croatia
Mediterranean Games medalists in basketball
Competitors at the 2009 Mediterranean Games